Stratton is an unincorporated community located in Newton County, Mississippi, United States.

History
Stratton was located on the Gulf, Mobile and Ohio Railroad. Stratton was founded in 1905 and was formed after the village of Stamper moved to be closer to the railroad. At one point, Stratton was home to a sawmill, four general stores, and a grocery store. Stratton was also the former site of a school.

A post office operated under the name Stratton from 1906 to 1956.

References

Unincorporated communities in Newton County, Mississippi
Unincorporated communities in Mississippi